The Florida State University College of Motion Picture Arts (colloquially known as The Film School) is the film school of the Florida State University. About 215 students are enrolled in classes, including undergraduates and graduate students, including Bachelor of Fine Arts and Master of Fine Arts students.

In 2017, Reb Braddock was named dean of the college. He succeeded Frank Patterson, who left the film school that year to become president of Pinewood Atlanta Studios.

In 2019, The Hollywood Reporter ranked the college #13 in its annual list of the top 25 American film schools.

In 2022, The FSU News announced that Florida State University College of Motion Picture Arts shot up be #14 in the Top 25 American Film Schools. As stated from Reb Braddock (the schools Dean), “We are so proud of our film school family,” Braddock said. “Especially our great alums who are out there working in every aspect of the movie business.” It was written in The Hollywood Reporter that the school can give a lot of credit towards its tight knit group of schools alums.

In September of 2022, FSU alumni and Director from the FSU College of Motion Picture Arts (MPA), Oualid Mouaness screened his latest film 1982 at the Ruby Diamond Concert Hall. The film is based on the directors memories of his childhood and of the Israeli invasion of Lebanon.

Notable alumni
Barry Jenkins – writer and director, Moonlight, If Beale Street Could Talk
T.S. Nowlin – screenwriter, The Maze Runner series
Sam Beam – composer, Twilight
Wes Ball – director, The Maze Runner series
Josh Tickell – writer and director, Fuel
David Robert Mitchell – writer and director, The Myth of the American Sleepover, It Follows
Ron J. Friedman – writer, Brother Bear, Chicken Little, Open Season
Greg Marcks – writer and director, 11:14, Echelon Conspiracy
Matt Chapman – co-creator (as one of The Brothers Chaps), Homestar Runner
Joi McMillon – editor, Moonlight, If Beale Street Could Talk
Lauren Miller – actress and screenwriter
Nat Sanders – editor, Short Term 12, Moonlight, If Beale Street Could Talk
Dan Murrell – editor and writer for Screen Junkies
Oualid Mouaness  - director, 1982

Notable faculty
Chip Chalmers – television director, Miami Vice, 7th Heaven, Beverly Hills, 90210, Melrose Place
Victor Nuñez – writer and director, Ruby in Paradise, Coastlines, Ulee's Gold
Donald Ungurait – founding dean, director of more than 50 plays, musicals and operas
Mark Vargo, ASC – cinematographer, Deep Impact, Ghostbusters, Rise of the Planet of the Apes

References

External links

 
Film schools in Florida
Educational institutions established in 1989
University subdivisions in Florida
1989 establishments in Florida